This is a list of Toyota road vehicles from past and present, sold under the Toyota brand. Most are designed and manufactured by Toyota Motor Corporation, while some vehicles are produced by other companies and supplied to Toyota through an OEM supply basis. Many models are limited to some regions, while some others are marketed worldwide.

Current vehicles

Past production vehicles
Toyota 1000 (1969–1981, also sold as the Publica in Japan)
Toyota 1900 (1960–1964)
Toyota 2000 (1973–1979, UK market version of the T100 Corona)
Toyota 2000GT (1967–1970)
Toyota AA (1936–1943)
Toyota AB (1936–1943)
Toyota AC (1943–1947)
Toyota AE (1941–1943)
Toyota Allex (2001–2006, hatchback version of Corolla E120, successor of Sprinter Cielo)
Toyota Altezza (1998–2005, also sold as the Lexus IS)
Toyota Altezza Gita (1998–2005, wagon version of Altezza)
Toyota Aristo (1991–2005, also sold as the Lexus GS)
Toyota Aurion (2006–2017)
Toyota Auris (2006–2020)
Toyota Avensis (1997–2018)
Toyota Avensis Verso (2001–2009, Europe, Australia and New Zealand version of the Ipsum)
Toyota Aygo (2005–2021)
Toyota BA (1940)
Toyota Bandeirante (1962–2001, Brazilian built Toyota Land Cruiser J40)
Toyota bB (2000–2016, sold as the Scion xB in the United States from 2003 to 2007)
Toyota Belta (2005–2016, also known as Yaris sedan or Vios in other markets)
Toyota Blade (2006–2012, upscale trim version of the Auris)
Toyota Blizzard (1980–1990, rebadge of Daihatsu Taft and Daihatsu Rugger)
Toyota Brevis (2001–2007)
Toyota Briska (1967–1968, pickup truck, continuation of Hino Briska, predecessor to Hilux)
Toyota Caldina (1992–2007)
Toyota Cami (1997–2005, more commonly sold as Daihatsu Terios)
Toyota Camry Coupe (1991–1996, coupe version of the XV10 Camry)
Toyota Camry Solara (1999–2008)
Toyota Carina (1970–2000)
Toyota Carina E (1992–1998)
Toyota Carina ED (1985–1998)
Toyota Carina FF (1984–1988)
Toyota Carina Surf (1982–1992, wagon version of Carina)
Toyota Carina II (1984–1992)
Toyota Celica (1970–2006)
Toyota Celica Camry (1980–1982)
Toyota Celica Supra (1978–1985)
Toyota Celica XX (1978–1985)
Toyota Celsior (1989–2005, also sold as the Lexus LS)
Toyota Chaser (1977–2000)
Toyota Classic (1996)
Toyota Comfort (1995–2017)
Toyota Corolla Ceres (1992–1999, sister car of Sprinter Marino)
Toyota Corolla II (Japanese version of Tercel)
Toyota Corolla Levin (1972–2000, sport coupe version of Corolla, sister product of Sprinter Trueno)
Toyota Corolla Rumion (2007–2015, also sold as the Scion xB from 2007 to 2016 and in Australia as the Rukus)
Toyota Corolla Spacio (1997–2007)
Toyota Corolla Sprinter (1968–1970)
Toyota Corolla SR5 (1983–1987)
Toyota Corolla Verso (2001–2009)
Toyota Corona (1957–2000)
Toyota Corona EXiV (1989–1998)
Toyota Corona Mark II (1968–2004, also known as the Mark II)
Toyota Corona SF (1992–1996, liftback version of the Corona for the Japanese market)
Toyota Corsa (1978–1999, Japanese version of the Tercel)
Toyota Cressida (1973–1992)
Toyota Cresta (1980–2001)
Toyota Crown Comfort (1995–2017)
Toyota Crown Majesta (1991–2018)
Toyota Curren (1994–1998)
Toyota Cynos (1991–1999)
Toyota DA (1936–1940, bus)
Toyota Duet (1997–2004, rebadged Daihatsu Storia)
Toyota Echo/Platz (2000–2005)
Toyota Esquire (2014–2021)
Toyota Estima/Previa (1999–2019)
Toyota FA (1954–1978)
Toyota FJ40 (1960–1984)
Toyota Fun Cargo (2000–2004)
Toyota Gaia (1998–2004)
Toyota Grand HiAce/Granvia (1999–2002)
Toyota Hilux Surf (1983–2009, Japanese version of the 4Runner)
Toyota Ipsum/Picnic (1995–2009, also sold as the Toyota Picnic from 2001, also sold as the Toyota Avensis Verso)
Toyota iQ (2008–2016, also sold as the Scion iQ)
Toyota Isis (2004–2017, successor of Gaia)
Toyota ist (2002–2016), also sold as the Scion xA in the United States and Toyota xA in the Middle East)
Toyota Kijang (1977–2004, known as Condor/Qualis/Revo/Stallion/Tamaraw/Unser/Zace outside Indonesia)
Toyota Lexcen (1989–1992, Australia, rebadged Holden Commodore)
Toyota Light Stout (1960–1978)
Toyota Macho (1960–1984, Venezuela-built Land Cruiser J40)
Toyota Mark II (1968–2004, also known as the Corona Mark II)
Toyota Mark II Blit (2002–2007)
Toyota Mark II Qualis (1997–2002, upmarket version of Camry Gracia wagon)
Toyota Mark X (2004–2019)
Toyota Mark X ZiO (2007–2013)
Toyota Massy Dyna (1969–1979, four-ton cab-over truck)
Toyota Master (1955–1956, also called the RR)
Toyota MasterAce (1982–1991)
Toyota Masterline (1962–1967)
Toyota Matrix (2002–2014)
Toyota Mega Cruiser (1996–2002)
Toyota MiniAce (1967–1975)
Toyota Model F (1984–1989, also called the Van, Tarago, Space Cruiser)
Toyota MR2 (1984–2005)
Toyota MR-S (1999–2007, Japanese version of the W30 MR2)
Toyota Nadia (1998–2003)
Toyota Opa (2000–2005)
Toyota Origin (2000)
Toyota Paseo (1991–1999, also sold in some markets as the Toyota Cynos)
Toyota Pixis Space (2011–2017, a rebadge of Daihatsu Move Conte)
Toyota Pixis Mega (2015–2022, a rebadge of Daihatsu Wake)
Toyota Porte/Spade (2004–2020)
Toyota Premio/Allion (2001–2021)
Toyota Prius c (2011–2021)
Toyota Prius v/+/α (2011–2021)
Toyota Progres (1998–2007)
Toyota Pronard (2002–2004, also called the Toyota Avalon)
Toyota Publica (1961–1978)
Toyota Qualis (1986–2004, Toyota Kijang sold in India and Nepal)
Toyota QuickDelivery (1982–2016)
Toyota Ractis (2005–2017)
Toyota Raum (1997–2011)
Toyota Regius (1997–2002, same as Toyota Hiace)
Toyota Revo (1998–2004)
Toyota RH (1953–1955, also called the Super)
Toyota RK (1953, small truck)
Toyota RR (1955–1956, also called the Master)
Toyota SA (1947–1952)
Toyota Sai (2009–2017)
Toyota SB (1947–1952, small truck)
Toyota Scepter (1991–1996, North American Camry sold in Japan)
Toyota SD (1949–1951)
Toyota Sera (1990–1995)
Toyota SF (1951–1953)
Toyota SG (1952, small truck)
Toyota Soarer (1981–2005, also sold as the Lexus SC)
Toyota Solara (1999–2008)
Toyota Soluna (variant of the Tercel made in Thailand and sold in Asia, 1996–2003)
Toyota Space Cruiser (1984–1989, UK version of the Van/Tarago/Model F)
Toyota Sparky (2000–2003, a rebadge of Daihatsu Atrai 7)
Toyota Sports 800 (1965–1969)
Toyota SportsVan (1995–2009, Danish built Ipsum)
Toyota Sprinter (1968–2000, sister car of Corolla)
Toyota Sprinter Carib (1984–2002, sister car of Corolla wagon)
Toyota Sprinter Cielo (1987–1991, sister car of Toyota Corolla (E90) liftback)
Toyota Sprinter Marino (1991–1998)
Toyota Sprinter Trueno (1972–2000, sport coupe version of Sprinter, sister product of Corolla Levin)
Toyota Stallion (1981–2004, African built version of the Kijang)
Toyota Starlet (1973–1999)
Toyota Stout (1962–198x)
Toyota Su-Ki (1943–1944, military vehicle built for World War II)
Toyota Succeed (2002–2020, integrated to Probox)
Toyota SunChaser (1979–1981, targa-top convertible version of the Celica built by Griffith)
Toyota Super (1953–1955, also called the RH or RHD)
Toyota T100 (1993–1998, North America)
Toyota Tamaraw (1998–2005, Philippines built version of the Toyota Kijang)
Toyota Tank (2016–2020)
Toyota Tarago (1983–2019)
Toyota Tercel (1978–1999)
Toyota Tiara (1960–1964, name used for the Corona RT20 sold on the international market)
Toyota ToyoAce (1954–2020)
Toyota Type 73 (1973, used as a military transport vehicle for Japan)
Toyota Urban Cruiser (2020) (2020–2022, rebadged Suzuki Vitara Brezza)
Toyota Van (1984–1989, North America, also called the Model F/Space Cruiser/Tarago)
Toyota VanWagon (1982–1991)
Toyota Verossa (2001–2003)
Toyota Verso (2009–2018)
Toyota Verso-S (2010–2017, European built Ractis)
Toyota Vienta (1995–2000) (Australian market variant of the Toyota Camry)
Toyota Vista (1982–2003)
Toyota Vitz (1999–2019)
Toyota Voltz (2002–2004 in Japan, sold as the Pontiac Vibe 2002–2009 in the USA)
Toyota Windom (1989–2007, also sold as the Lexus ES)
Toyota Wish (2003–2017, sold in Hong Kong and Singapore)
Toyota Yaris (DJ/DL) (2016—2020, sold in North America, also sold as the Scion iA)
Toyota Yaris Verso (2000–2004)
Toyota Zelas (2010–2016, also sold as the Scion tC)

Concept vehicles
The following is a partial list of concept cars Toyota developed. The year indicates when the vehicle was first officially shown to the public.

See also 
 Lexus
 Scion
 Hino
 Daihatsu
 List of Daihatsu vehicles
 Eiji Toyoda
 List of Toyota engines

References

External links 

 Toyota concept cars (Stepho)
 Toyota Prototypes (2000GT) 
 Toyota Owners Club

Toyota

Toyota